The Aurora Borealis Express is an overnight express train operating between Helsinki and Kolari in Finland. The train travels via many major cities and towns in Finland, and stops at most of them. The total distance is a little under 1000 kilometers, and lasts for 14½ hours to 16 hours depending on direction and season.  The service is bi-directional, with a corresponding train operating southwards over the same route. 

The train consists of seven to ten sleeping cars, two open seating cars and one restaurant car. The car types are older blue cars, which are rarely used nowadays in Finland. A few car carrier wagons are added at the end of the train to transport cars. On the last distance from Oulu to Kolari the electric locomotive is switched out for a diesel locomotive since the railway line to Kolari isn't electrified.

The train travels northbound and southbound on varying days of the week, depending upon the time of year. Passenger demand is variable, and somewhat seasonal.

Stops

See also
 List of named passenger trains of Europe

References

External links
 RailFan Europe: Pictures of the train

Named passenger trains of Finland
Night trains